William Wain Prior (18 July 1876 – 9 March 1946) was a Danish Lieutenant general and the Chief of the Royal Danish Army from 1939 to 1941.

Life and career

Following the death of Johan Christian Lund, in 1931, Prior became chief of the General Staff.

On 1 December 1939, Prior replaced  as chief of the General Command.

World War II
Before the Occupation of Denmark by Germany in 1940, Prior encouraged the Danish government to increase the strength of the army. These requests, however, were not accepted by the majority of the Danish parliament, who feared that increased military strength might provoke Nazi Germany.

When Germany invaded Denmark in 1940, he argued that the Danish army should actively defend the country, even when Germany threatened through the dropping the OPROP! leaflets to bomb the capital of Copenhagen. However, the Danish government did not agree to this, due to concerns that major Danish cities like Copenhagen might suffer the same destruction that other cities like Warsaw had just experienced during the German invasion of Poland.  The government was also well aware that Denmark's position was untenable; it was too small and too flat to hold out against the Wehrmacht for a sustained period.

Prior continued as Commander-in-Chief of the Danish Army during the early part of the German occupation, and worked actively to prevent the Danish army from becoming involved on the German side during World War II. He resigned as Commander-in-Chief in October 1941 and was replaced by Lieutenant General Ebbe Gørtz.

Selected works

References

Bibliography
 
 
 
 
 
 
 
 

1876 births
1946 deaths
People from Copenhagen
Danish generals
Chiefs of the Royal Danish Army
Danish people of World War II
20th-century Danish military personnel